The Tien Shan red-backed vole (Myodes centralis) is a species of rodent in the family Cricetidae.
It is found in China and Kyrgyzstan.

References

Musser, G. G. and M. D. Carleton. 2005. Superfamily Muroidea. pp. 894–1531 in Mammal Species of the World a Taxonomic and Geographic Reference. D. E. Wilson and D. M. Reeder eds. Johns Hopkins University Press, Baltimore.

Myodes
Rodents of China
Mammals of Central Asia
Mammals described in 1906
Taxonomy articles created by Polbot